Trgovište may refer to the following places:

Serbia
Trgovište, small town and municipality in Pčinja District
Trgovište (Knjaževac), village in Knjaževac Municipality
Trgovište (Kraljevo), village in Kraljevo Municipality
Trgovište (Sokobanja), village in Sokobanja Municipality
Staro Trgovište, old market-place near Stari Ras in Novi Pazar Municipality
Novo Trgovište, old Serbian name for the city of Novi Pazar

Bosnia and Herzegovina
Trgovište, Bosnia and Herzegovina, village in Republika Srpska

See also
 
 Targoviste (disambiguation)